Cherry Tree Hill is a village in the parish of Saint Andrew in Barbados.  It is approximately 850 ft. above sea level.  It is believed that cherry trees lined the hill at some point, which has since been replaced by mahogany trees.  The village overlooks the Scotland District.

Populated places in Barbados
Saint Andrew, Barbados

Location: Cherry Tree Hill Reserve
Barbados
https://goo.gl/maps/4cdxNxdN3im